16 dobles was a Catalan TV series which was aired on TV3. It was directed by Orestes Lara. 26 episodes were aired between January and December 2003. The series is a (sort of) sequel of Temps de silenci.

Cast
 Marta Marco
 Marc Humet
 Ángels Gutiérrez
 Oscar Morales
 Nuria Prims
 Cristina Brondo
 David Janer
 Miquel Sitjar

References

2003 Spanish television series debuts
2003 Spanish television series endings
Catalan television programmes
2000s Spanish drama television series
Television series by Diagonal TV